{{Infobox person
| name               = Jacques Hurtubise
| image              = Jacques Hurtubise - Zyx - en 1973.jpg
| alt                = 
| caption            = Jacques Hurtubise in 1973
| birth_name         = 
| birth_date         = 1950
| birth_place        = Ottawa, Ontario, Canada
| death_date         = 
| death_place        = Montreal, Quebec, Canada
| nationality        = Canadian
| other_names        = Zyx
| occupation         = cartoonist and publisher
| years_active       = 
| known_for          = Croc magazine
| awards             = Joe Shuster Award 2007
}}
Jacques Hurtubise (November 1950 – 11 December 2015) was a Canadian cartoonist and publisher.  He was one of the founders of Croc magazine and is considered one of the most prominent figures in Quebec comics of the 1970s and 1980s.

He was born in Ottawa. Hurtubise's earliest work appeared in his first attempt at a comics magazine was L'Hydrocéphale Illustré in November 1971, in collaboration with Gilles Desjardins and Françoise Barrette. It was not a success.  Following it, he founded a group of young Canadian artists called the Coopérative des Petits Dessins.  Throughout the 1970s he produced over 200 comic strips for the newspaper Le Jour.  In these strips appeared the characters le Sombre Vilain and his sidekick Bill, the gluttonous boa constrictor who loved to eat pizza delivery men.  These adventures continued in the humorous magazine Croc, which he founded in 1979 with Hélène Fleury and Roch Côté.

Hurtubise is one of only two Québécois cartoonists, with Albert Chartier, to appear in Le Dictionnaire mondial de la Bande Dessinée and The World Encyclopedia of Comics.  In 2007 he won the Joe Shuster Award, an award for Canadian cartoonists.  His works and letters are kept in the Bibliothèque et Archives nationales du Québec.

Hurtubise was also the Rhinoceros Party candidate in 1979 for the Papineau riding. On 11 December 2015, he died in Montreal at the age of 65.

References

 Bell, John; Pomerleau, Luc; MacMillan, Robert (1986) Canuck comics, a Guide to Comic Books Published in Canada. éditions Matrix Books
  Carpentier, André (1975) La BDK, La Bande Dessinée Kébécoise. éditions La Barre du Jour
 Dubois, Bernard (1996) Bande dessinée québécoise : répertoire bibliographique à suivre, 1996, éditions D.B.K.
 Falardeau, Mira (1994) La Bande dessinée au Québec. éditions du Boréal, collection Boréal Express
 Falardeau, Mira (2008) Histoire de la bande dessinée au Québec VLB éditeur, collection Études québécoises
 Viau, Michel (1999) BDQ, Répertoire des publications de bandes dessinées au Québec des origines à nos jours''. éditions Mille-Îles. 

1950 births
2015 deaths
Canadian comic strip cartoonists
Canadian cartoonists
Rhinoceros Party of Canada candidates in the 1979 Canadian federal election